Amuropaludina chloantha is a species of freshwater snail with a gill and an operculum, an aquatic gastropod mollusk in the family Viviparidae.

Distribution 
This species is found in the Amur River basin, in Russia. The type locality is "various tributaries of the central part of the Amur River" ("divers affluents de l'Amour moyen").

Description 
The width of the shell is 16 mm. The height of the shell is 16 mm.

References

External links 

Viviparidae